The Nevada Medal was established in 1988 by the Desert Research Institute. It is awarded for "outstanding achievement in science and engineering", and is presented by the Governor of Nevada. The previous recipients are:

 Verner Suomi
 Dwight Billings
 James A. Van Allen
 Benoit Mandelbrot
 Carl Djerassi
 Margaret Bryan Davis
 John N. Bahcall
 Charles Elachi
 Hector F. DeLuca
 F. Sherwood Rowland
 Lynn Margulis
 Wallace Broecker
 Harold Mooney
 John H. Seinfeld
 M. Gordon Wolman
 Charles Goldman
 Fakhri A. Bazzaz
 Farouk El-Baz
 Donald Grayson
 Walter Alvarez
 Susan Lindquist
 James E. Hansen
 Francis Collins
 Robert Ballard
 Steven Squyres
 Nina Fedoroff
 Albert Yu-Min Lin
 Christopher McKay
 Missy Cummings
 Marcia McNutt
 Kathryn Sullivan (2020)

References

Awards established in 1988
American science and technology awards